Chorthippus is a large genus of acridid grasshoppers with around 230 described species. The genus may be subdivided into subgenera including: Altichorthippus, Chorthippus and Glyptobothrus, with other species not placed.

Species
The Orthoptera Species File includes:

 Chorthippus abchasicus Ramme, 1939
 Chorthippus acroleucus (Müller, 1924)  (white-tipped grasshopper)
 Chorthippus aktaci Ünal, 2010
 Chorthippus albomarginatus (De Geer, 1773) (lesser marsh grasshopper) type species (as Acrydium albomarginatum De Geer = C. albomarginatus albomarginatus)
 Chorthippus albonemus Zheng & Tu, 1964
 Chorthippus almoranus Uvarov, 1942
 Chorthippus alticola Ramme, 1921  (alpine grasshopper)
 Chorthippus alxaensis Zheng, 2000
 Chorthippus amplilineatus Ma & Guo, 1995
 Chorthippus amplimedilocus Zheng & Yang, 1997
 Chorthippus amplintersitus Liu, 1981
 Chorthippus angulatus Tarbinsky, 1927
 Chorthippus antecessor Sirin & Çiplak, 2010  (Adana grasshopper)
 Chorthippus antennalis Umnov, 1931
 Chorthippus apicalis (Herrich-Schäffer, 1840)
 Chorthippus apricarius (Linnaeus, 1758)  (locomotive grasshopper)
 Chorthippus apricaroides Zheng & Ren, 2007
 Chorthippus ariasi (Bolívar, 1908)  (Sierra de Gredos grasshopper)
 Chorthippus armoricanus (Defaut, 2015)
 Chorthippus aroliumulus Xia & Jin, 1982
 Chorthippus atlasi Defaut, 1987
 Chorthippus atridorsus Jia & Liang, 1993
 Chorthippus badachshani Bey-Bienko, 1963
 Chorthippus badius Mistshenko, 1951
 Chorthippus beianensis Zheng & Sun, 2007
 Chorthippus bellus Zhang & Jin, 1985
 Chorthippus biguttulus (Linnaeus, 1758)  (bow-winged grasshopper)
 Chorthippus bilineatus Zhang, 1984
 Chorthippus binotatus (Charpentier, 1825)  (red-legged grasshopper)
 Chorthippus biroi (Kuthy, 1907)  (Cretan grasshopper)
 Chorthippus bornhalmi Harz, 1971  (bornhalm's grasshopper)
 Chorthippus bozdaghi Uvarov, 1934  (Bozdagh grasshopper)
 Chorthippus brachypterus (Werner, 1932)
 Chorthippus brevicornis Wang & Zheng, 1994
 Chorthippus brevipterus Yin, 1984
 Chorthippus brunneus (Thunberg, 1815)  (common field grasshopper)
 Chorthippus bucharicus Bey-Bienko, 1948
 Chorthippus buerjinensis Wang & Zheng, 2010
 Chorthippus burripes Zheng & Xin, 1999
 Chorthippus caliginosus Mistshenko, 1951
 Chorthippus caporiaccoi Salfi, 1934
 Chorthippus cavilosus Mistshenko, 1951
 Chorthippus cazurroi (Bolívar, 1898)  (Cazurro's grasshopper)
 Chorthippus changbaishanensis Liu, 1987  (Jilin grasshopper)
 Chorthippus changtunensis Yin, 1984
 Chorthippus chapini Chang, 1939
 Chorthippus chayuensis Yin, 1984
 Chorthippus chloroticus (Bolívar, 1908)  (greenish field grasshopper)
 Chorthippus cialancensis Nadig, 1986  (Piedmont grasshopper)
 Chorthippus conicaudatus Xia & Jin, 1982
 Chorthippus corsicus (Chopard, 1924)  (Corsican grasshopper)
 Chorthippus crassiceps Ramme, 1926  (plump-headed grasshopper)
 Chorthippus dabanshanensis Chen, Zeng & Bao, 2011
 Chorthippus dahinganlingensis Lian & Zheng, 1987
 Chorthippus daitongensis Huo, 1994
 Chorthippus daixianensis Zheng, Shi & Ma, 1996
 Chorthippus darvazicus Mistshenko, 1951  (Darvaz grasshopper)
 Chorthippus dashanensis Mao, Ren & Ou, 2011
 Chorthippus davatchii Descamps, 1967
 Chorthippus daweishanensis Fu & Zheng, 2000
 Chorthippus demokidovi (Ramme, 1930)
 Chorthippus deqinensis Liu, 1984
 Chorthippus dichrous (Eversmann, 1859)  (two-coloured grasshopper)
 Chorthippus dierli Ingrisch, 1990
 Chorthippus dirshi Fishelson, 1969
 Chorthippus dorsatus (Zetterstedt, 1821)  (steppe grasshopper)
 Chorthippus dubius (Zubovski, 1898)
 Chorthippus eisentrauti (Ramme, 1931)  (Eisentraut's bow-winged grasshopper)
 Chorthippus elbursianus Mistshenko, 1951
 Chorthippus ezuoqiensis Ren, Wang & Zhang, 1998
 Chorthippus fallax (Zubovski, 1900)
 Chorthippus ferdinandi Vedenina & Helversen, 2009  (Ferdinand's grasshopper)
 Chorthippus ferghanensis Umnov, 1931
 Chorthippus flavabdomenis Liu, 1981
 Chorthippus flavitibias Zheng, Ma & Wang, 1996
 Chorthippus flexivenoides Zheng, Zhang, Sun, Li & Xu, 2008
 Chorthippus foveatus Xia & Jin, 1982
 Chorthippus gansuensis Zheng, 1999
 Chorthippus geminus Mistshenko, 1951
 Chorthippus genheensis Li & Yin, 1987
 Chorthippus giganteus Mistshenko, 1951
 Chorthippus gongbuensis Liang & Zheng, 1991
 Chorthippus gongshanensis Zheng & Mao, 1997
 Chorthippus grahami Chang, 1937
 Chorthippus guandishanensis Ma, Zheng & Guo, 2000
 Chorthippus guansuacris (Cao, Shen & Xie, 1991)
 Chorthippus haibeiensis Zheng & Chen, 2001
 Chorthippus halawuensis Zheng, 2000
 Chorthippus hallasanus (Storozhenko & Paik, 2007)
 Chorthippus hammarstroemi (Miram, 1907)
 Chorthippus hebeiensis Li & Jiang, 2011
 Chorthippus heiheensis Wang, 2007
 Chorthippus heilongjiangensis Lian & Zheng, 1987
 Chorthippus helanshanensis Zheng, 1999
 Chorthippus helverseni Mol, Çiplak & Sirin, 2003
 Chorthippus hemipterus Uvarov, 1926
 Chorthippus hengshanensis Ma, Guo & Zheng, 1995
 Chorthippus himalayanus Balderson & Yin, 1987
 Chorthippus hirtus Uvarov, 1927
 Chorthippus horqinensis Li & Yin, 1987
 Chorthippus hsiai Zheng & Tu, 1964
 Chorthippus huchengensis Xia & Jin, 1982
 Chorthippus hyrcanus Bey-Bienko, 1960
 Chorthippus ilkazi Uvarov, 1934  (Ilgaz mountain grasshopper)
 Chorthippus indus Uvarov, 1942
 Chorthippus ingenitzkyi (Zubovski, 1898)
 Chorthippus intermedius (Bey-Bienko, 1926)
 Chorthippus jachontovi Mistshenko, 1951
 Chorthippus jacobsi Harz, 1975  (Iberian field grasshopper)
 Chorthippus jacobsoni (Ikonnikov, 1911)
 Chorthippus jilinensis Ren, Zhao & Hao, 2002
 Chorthippus jishishanensis Zheng & Xie, 2000
 Chorthippus johnseni Harz, 1982
 Chorthippus jucundus (Fischer, 1853)
 Chorthippus jutlandica Fogh Nielsen, 2003  (Jutland bow-winged grasshopper)
 Chorthippus kalunshanensis Wang, 2007
 Chorthippus kanasensis Wang & Zheng, 2012
 Chorthippus kangdingensis Zheng & Shi, 2007
 Chorthippus karatavicus Bey-Bienko, 1936
 Chorthippus karateghinicus Mistshenko, 1951
 Chorthippus karelini (Uvarov, 1910)
 Chorthippus kazdaghensis Mol & Çiplak, 2005
 Chorthippus keshanensis Zhang, Zheng & Ren, 1993
 Chorthippus ketmenicus Bey-Bienko, 1949
 Chorthippus kirghizicus Mistshenko, 1979
 Chorthippus kiyosawai Furukawa, 1950
 Chorthippus kusnetzovi Bey-Bienko, 1949
 Chorthippus labaumei Ramme, 1926
 Chorthippus lacustris La Greca & Messina, 1975  (Epirus dancing grasshopper)
 Chorthippus latilifoveatus Xia & Jin, 1982
 Chorthippus latisulcus Zheng & He, 1995
 Chorthippus lebanicus Massa & Fontana, 1998
 Chorthippus leduensis Zheng & Xin, 1999
 Chorthippus loratus (Fischer von Waldheim, 1846)
 Chorthippus louguanensis Zheng & Tu, 1964
 Chorthippus luminosus Mistshenko, 1951
 Chorthippus macrocerus (Fischer von Waldheim, 1846)
 Chorthippus maracandicus Mistshenko, 1979
 Chorthippus maritimus Mistshenko, 1951
 Chorthippus markamensis Yin, 1984
 Chorthippus marocanus Nadig, 1976
 Chorthippus messinai (La Greca, Di Mauro, Viglianisi & Monello, 2000)  (Messina's grasshopper)
 Chorthippus miramae Ramme, 1939
 Chorthippus mistshenkoi Avakyan, 1956
 Chorthippus mollis (Charpentier, 1825)  (lesser grasshopper)
 Chorthippus monilicornis Umnov, 1931
 Chorthippus moreanus Willemse, Helversen & Odé, 2009  (Morea grasshopper)
 Chorthippus muktinathensis Balderson & Yin, 1987
 Chorthippus neipopennis Xia & Jin, 1982
 Chorthippus nemus Liu, 1984
 Chorthippus nepalensis Balderson & Yin, 1987
 Chorthippus nevadensis Pascual, 1976  (Sierra Nevadan grasshopper)
 Chorthippus nigricanivenus Zheng, Ma & Wang, 1996
 Chorthippus ningwuensis Zheng, Shi & Ma, 1996
 Chorthippus obtusicaudatus Mao, Ren & Ou, 2011
 Chorthippus occidentalis Xia & Jin, 1982
 Chorthippus oreophilus Bey-Bienko, 1948
 Chorthippus oschei Helversen, 1986  (Carpathian dancing grasshopper) 
 Chorthippus pamiricus (Ramme, 1930)
 Chorthippus parnon Willemse, Helversen & Odé, 2009  (Parnon grasshopper)
 Chorthippus pascuus Umnov, 1931
 Chorthippus pavlovskii Mistshenko, 1951
 Chorthippus peneri Fishelson, 1969
 Chorthippus pilipes Bey-Bienko, 1933
 Chorthippus planidentis Xia & Jin, 1982
 Chorthippus plotnikovi Umnov, 1931
 Chorthippus porphyropterus (Voroncovskij, 1928)
 Chorthippus pulloides Ramme, 1926  (nymph-like grasshopper)
 Chorthippus pullus (Philippi, 1830)  (gravel grasshopper)
 Chorthippus qilianshanensis Zheng & Xie, 2000
 Chorthippus qingzangensis Yin, 1984
 Chorthippus qixingtaiensis Yin, Ye & Yin, 2014
 Chorthippus rebuntoensis (Ishikawa, 2002)
 Chorthippus reissingeri Harz, 1972  (Reissinger's grasshopper)
 Chorthippus relicticus Sirin, Helversen & Çiplak, 2010  (Karaman grasshopper)
 Chorthippus robustus Mistshenko, 1979
 Chorthippus rubensabdomenis Liu, 1981
 Chorthippus rubratibialis Schmidt, 1978  (Italian bow-winged grasshopper)
 Chorthippus ruficornus Zheng, 1988
 Chorthippus rufifemurus Zheng, Ma & Wang, 1996
 Chorthippus rufipennis Jia & Liang, 1993
 Chorthippus saitzevi Mistshenko, 1979
 Chorthippus sampeyrensis Nadig, 1986  (Sampeyre grasshopper)
 Chorthippus sangiorgii (Finot, 1902)  (Cephalonia grasshopper)
 Chorthippus sanlanggothis Ingrisch & Garai, 2001
 Chorthippus saulcyi (Krauss, 1888)  (French grasshopper)
 Chorthippus savalanicus Uvarov, 1933
 Chorthippus saxatilis Bey-Bienko, 1948
 Chorthippus separatanus Liu, 1981
 Chorthippus shantariensis Mistshenko, 1951
 Chorthippus shantungensis Chang, 1939
 Chorthippus shennongjiaensis Zheng & Li, 2000
 Chorthippus shumakovi Bey-Bienko, 1963
 Chorthippus similis Umnov, 1930
 Chorthippus smardai Chládek, 2014  (Slovakian grasshopper)
 Chorthippus songoricus Bey-Bienko, 1936
 Chorthippus squamopennis Zheng, 1980
 Chorthippus supranimbus Yamasaki, 1968
 Chorthippus szijji Harz, 1982
 Chorthippus tadzhicus Mistshenko, 1951
 Chorthippus taibaiensis Zheng, Li & Wei, 2009
 Chorthippus taishanensis Yin, Ye & Yin, 2010
 Chorthippus taiyuanensis Ma, Guo & Zheng, 1995
 Chorthippus taurensis Sirin & Çiplak, 2005
 Chorthippus tianshanensis Liu & Fan, 1992
 Chorthippus tianshanicus Umnov, 1930
 Chorthippus tiantangensis Zhong & Zheng, 2004
 Chorthippus tibetanus Uvarov, 1935
 Chorthippus transalajicus Mistshenko, 1979
 Chorthippus trinacriae (La Greca, Di Mauro, Viglianisi & Monello, 2000)  (Sicilian Lesser grasshopper)
 Chorthippus turanicus Tarbinsky, 1925
 Chorthippus unicubitus Xia & Jin, 1982
 Chorthippus uvarovi Bey-Bienko, 1929
 Chorthippus vagans (Eversmann, 1848)  (heath grasshopper)
 Chorthippus vicinus Mistshenko, 1951
 Chorthippus wenquanensis Wang & Zheng, 2012
 Chorthippus willemsei Harz, 1971  (Willemse's grasshopper)
 Chorthippus wuyishanensis Zheng & Ma, 1999
 Chorthippus wuyuerhensis Zheng, Zhang, Sun, Li & Xu, 2008
 Chorthippus xiaoxinganlingensis Wang, 2007
 Chorthippus xiningensis Zheng & Chen, 2001
 Chorthippus xueshanensis Zheng & Mao, 1997
 Chorthippus xunhuaensis Zheng & Xie, 2000
 Chorthippus yajiangensis Zheng & Shi, 2007
 Chorthippus yanmenguanensis Zheng & Shi, 1995
 Chorthippus yanyuanensis Jin & Lin, 1982-1983
 Chorthippus yersini Harz, 1975  (Yersin's grasshopper)
 Chorthippus yulingensis Zheng & Tu, 1964
 Chorthippus zaitzevi Mistshenko, 1979
 Chorthippus zhengi Ma & Guo, 1995

References

 
Acrididae genera
Taxa named by Franz Xaver Fieber